Auburn was an electoral district of the Legislative Assembly in the Australian state of Queensland from 1972 to 1992.

First created for the 1972 state election, it largely replaced the abolished district of Mackenzie. Based in the west Burnett region, it was always a National Party seat.

Auburn was abolished ahead of 1992 state election, largely absorbed into the pre-existing district of Callide, with parts also going to the new district of Fitzroy.

Members for Auburn

Election results

See also
 Electoral districts of Queensland
 Members of the Queensland Legislative Assembly by year
 :Category:Members of the Queensland Legislative Assembly by name

References

Former electoral districts of Queensland
Constituencies established in 1972
1972 establishments in Australia
1992 disestablishments in Australia
Constituencies disestablished in 1992